Andrew Boyd Dilworth (December 14, 1814 – July 2, 1894) was an American farmer, politician, and military officer.

Biography
Dilworth was born in Rockingham County, North Carolina.

During the 1830s, Dilworth worked in an official government capacity in Corinth, Mississippi.  He then returned to Rockingham County, where he convinced his father and uncle to purchase farmland available near Corinth.  The family moved to nearby Danville in 1837 or 1838.

Dilworth was elected to the Mississippi House of Representatives, and served as a Democrat from 1846-1850, representing Tishomingo County (this part of Tishomingo County became part of the newly created Alcorn County in 1870).  Dilworth served as Secretary of State of Mississippi from January 1855 to January 1860, and as State Auditor of Mississippi from 1861 to 1862.

Dilworth oversaw the construction of the Jacinto Courthouse, completed in 1854, in Jacinto, Mississippi.

During the American Civil War, Dilworth served as Quartermaster General in the Confederate States Army.  Stationed in Iuka, Mississippi, Dilworth is noted for negotiating the release of Confederate prisoners from Camp Douglas in Chicago.  Dilworth was also responsible for signing paper currency and financial vouchers during the war.

Dilworth died on July 2, 1894, and is buried in John Dilworth Cemetery, south of Corinth.  A historic plaque in his honor is located there.

References

1814 births
1894 deaths
People from Rockingham County, North Carolina
People from Corinth, Mississippi
Democratic Party members of the Mississippi House of Representatives
18th-century American politicians
People from Iuka, Mississippi
19th-century American politicians